We Are Young. We Are Strong is a 2014 German drama film directed by Burhan Qurbani, a fictionalized account of the 1992 xenophobic Rostock-Lichtenhagen riots. It was one of eight films shortlisted by Germany to be their submission for the Academy Award for Best Foreign Language Film at the 88th Academy Awards, but it lost out to Labyrinth of Lies.

Cast
 Devid Striesow as Martin
 Jonas Nay as Stefan
 Trang Le Hong as Lien
 Joel Basman as Robbie
 David Schütter as Sandro
 Saskia Rosendahl as Jennie

References

External links
 

2014 films
2014 drama films
2010s German-language films
German drama films
Films set in 1992
Films about immigration
Films about neo-Nazism
Films about racism
2010s German films